James Bernard Vivian Orr CVO (19 November 1917 – 14 June 2008) was a police officer and Private Secretary to the Duke of Edinburgh from 1957 to 1970.

Orr was educated at Harrow School, and Gordonstoun School, and the Royal Military College, Sandhurst.

He joined the British South Africa Police in 1939, and remained until 1946. From 1941 to 1949, he was attached to the Ethiopia and Eritrea occupied Enemy Territory Administration Police Forces. In 1954–1957, he was a member of the Kenya Police.

Orr joined the Household of the Duke of Edinburgh in 1957. He retired in May 1970. From 1970 he was an Extra Equerry to the Duke of Edinburgh, and he subsequently worked as Secretary of the Medical Commission on Accident Prevention.

He was unmarried.

Orr was appointed a Member of the Royal Victorian Order (MVO) in 1962, and was promoted to Commander (CVO) in the 1968 Birthday Honours.

References

1917 births
2008 deaths
People educated at Gordonstoun
Commanders of the Royal Victorian Order
British South Africa Police officers
British colonial police officers
People educated at Harrow School
Graduates of the Royal Military College, Sandhurst
Kenyan police officers
Commanders Crosses of the Order of Merit of the Federal Republic of Germany